The Women's Super-G in the 2021 FIS Alpine Skiing World Cup consisted of 6 events, with one cancellation from the scheduled seven. Swiss skier Lara Gut-Behrami won four of the first five Super-Gs to establish an 195-point lead over Swiss teammate and defending discipline champion Corinne Suter with only two races to go, and she clinched the discipline title for 2021 after the sixth event, which turned out to be the last one for the season. 

The season was interrupted by the 2021 World Ski Championships, which were held from 8–21 February in Cortina d'Ampezzo, Italy.  The women's Super-G was scheduled for 9 February 2021 but was cancelled due to fog and finally took place on 11 February 2021.

The final was scheduled for Thursday, 18 March in Lenzerheide, Switzerland. Only the top 25 of the specific ranking and the winner of the Junior World Championship were eligible, although athletes who had scored at least 500 points in the overall classification can participate in all specialties. Due to injuries, only 22 of the top 25 were scheduled to compete, joined by one 500-point skier (Wendy Holdener) and the 2021 junior champion in Super-G (Lena Wechner of Austria). However, a continuation of the bad weather that forced the cancellation of the downhill final led to cancellation of the Super-G final as well.

Standings

DNF = Did Not Finish
DNS = Did Not Start

See also
 2021 Alpine Skiing World Cup – Women's summary rankings
 2021 Alpine Skiing World Cup – Women's Overall
 2021 Alpine Skiing World Cup – Women's Downhill
 2021 Alpine Skiing World Cup – Women's Giant Slalom
 2021 Alpine Skiing World Cup – Women's Slalom
 2021 Alpine Skiing World Cup – Women's Parallel
 World Cup scoring system

References

External links
 Alpine Skiing at FIS website

Women's Super-G
FIS Alpine Ski World Cup women's Super-G discipline titles